Aimlessness is an album by Dntel, released on June 1, 2012. It is Dntel's first LP under the Pampa Records label.

Reception
Aimlessness received mixed reviews from critics. On Metacritic, the album holds a score of 68/100 based on 10 reviews, indicating "generally favorable reviews".

Track listing 
"Waitingfortherest II"
"Jitters"
"Still"
"My Orphaned Son"
"Bright Night"
"Retracer"
"Puma"
"Santa Ana Winds"
"Trudge"
"Jitters (Geotic Mix)"
"Doc (Dntel Mix)"
"Paper Landscape"

References

2012 albums
Dntel albums